The Moyon people, also known as Bujuur people or the Moyon Naga, are a Tibeto-Burmese ethnic group predominantly resides in the Northeast Indian state of Manipur and, some in Sagaing Region in Myanmar. They are listed as a Scheduled Tribe (STs) by India. They share close cultural and linguistic affinity with Monsang people .

References

Scheduled Tribes of Manipur
Ethnic groups in India
Ethnic groups in Manipur
Ethnic groups in Myanmar
Naga people